Jima of Silla (died 134, r. 112–134) was the sixth ruler of Silla, one of the Three Kingdoms of Korea.  He is commonly called Jima Isageum, isageum being the royal title in early Silla. As a descendant of Silla's founder Hyeokgeose, his surname was Bak.

Background
Jima was the eldest son of the previous king, Pasa Isageum, and Lady Saseong. He married Lady Aerye, of the Kim clan.

Family
Grandfather: Yuri Isageum
Grandmother: Queen Kim, of the Kim clan (부인딸 김씨)
Father: Pasa of Silla
Mother: Queen Saseong, of the Kim clan (사성부인 김씨)
Wife: 
Queen Aerye (애례부인 김씨), of the Kim clan, daughter of Maje Galmunwang  (갈문왕 마제)
Daughter: Queen Naeryo ( 내례부인), who married Adalla of Silla and did not have issue
Son: Bak Ah-do, known as Addo Galmunwang (아도 갈문왕)

Reign
Relations with Baekje, another of the Three Kingdoms, were peaceful during his reign, with the continuation of a truce established by Jima's predecessor Pasa.  When the Malgal attacked from the north in 125, Jima requested aid from Baekje, and Giru sent an army to successfully repel the invaders.

Relations with neighboring Gaya confederacy were also peaceful, after Jima's unsuccessful invasion attempts across the Nakdong River in 115 and 116.

In 123, he established relations with the Japanese kingdom of Wa.

Jima died without a male heir to the throne.

See also
Proto–Three Kingdoms of Korea
Three Kingdoms of Korea
History of Korea
Rulers of Korea

References

The Academy of Korean Studies
Korea Britannica
Doosan Encyclopedia

Silla rulers
134 deaths
2nd-century monarchs in Asia
Year of birth unknown
2nd-century Korean people